General Law may refer to:

Evander M. Law (1836–1920), Confederate States Army brigadier general and (according to some reports) major general
Robert Law (c. 1788–1874), British Army lieutenant general

See also
Attorney General Law (disambiguation)
General-law municipality
General Laws of Massachusetts